Johan Ferdinand Nyström (April 16, 1874 in Håtuna – September 30, 1968 in Tierp) was a Swedish track and field athlete who competed at the 1900 Summer Olympics in Paris, France. Nyström competed in the marathon.  He was one of six runners who failed to finish the event.

References

External links 

 De Wael, Herman. Herman's Full Olympians: "Athletics 1900". Accessed 18 March 2006.
 

1874 births
1968 deaths
Swedish male long-distance runners
Swedish male marathon runners
Olympic athletes of Sweden
Athletes (track and field) at the 1900 Summer Olympics
People from Upplands-Bro Municipality
Sportspeople from Stockholm County